"21st Century Breakdown" is a song by American rock band Green Day from their album of the same name. Billie Joe Armstrong composed the song, which is mainly based on his personal life and musical influences. The song was released as the fourth single from the album on December 21, 2009.

Background and composition
Much of the song was written about the personal life of its writer, Armstrong. According to David Fricke of Rolling Stone, its opening lyrics "Born into Nixon, I was raised in hell" refer to Armstrong's birth year of 1972, while "We are the class of the class of '13" references his eldest son Joseph's high school graduation year of 2013. Later in the song, lyrics begin to reference the song's musical influences: "Last one born / but first one to run" is an allusion to Bruce Springsteen's Born to Run, while "I never made it as a working class hero" is a reference to the John Lennon song "Working Class Hero", which the band had previously released a cover of.

Spin suggested that the song's guitar usage is similar to that of The Edge.

Release and reception
On September 10, 2009, Green Day's official site announced that the song would be the band's next single. However, on September 25, Green Day instead said that "East Jesus Nowhere" would be released as the next single and offered a release date of October 19. On October 21, the band again asserted that "21st Century Breakdown" would be released as a single and gave a release date of December 21.

Reception to the song has been mainly positive. Spin thought that it was "Green Day's most epic song yet". AbsolutePunk stated that the song "bursts forth with resilient aplomb". Adam Downer of Sputnikmusic called the track "heavily indebted to The Who [and] Queen".

Music video
The music video for "21st Century Breakdown" was directed by Marc Webb. It premiered on-air and online October 19, 2009 on MTV and a number of its subsidiary websites. It starts off with a wall with the spray-painted woman and man from the album art of 21st Century Breakdown. After they kiss, the first chord strikes. The video is animated in graffiti until the final thirty seconds, when the graffiti version of Armstrong transitions into the real Armstrong and the video concludes in live action.

Track listing

Charts

Personnel
Billie Joe Armstrong – lead vocals, guitar, piano
Mike Dirnt – bass guitar, backing vocals
Tré Cool – drums, percussion

References

2009 singles
Green Day songs
Songs written by Billie Joe Armstrong
Song recordings produced by Butch Vig
Music videos directed by Marc Webb
2008 songs
2009 songs
Reprise Records singles
Songs written by Mike Dirnt
Songs written by Tré Cool